Ahmed Ibrahim is a Ghanaian politician and member of the Seventh Parliament of the Fourth Republic of Ghana representing the Banda Constituency in the Bono Region on the ticket of the National Democratic Congress. He is currently the Deputy Minority Chief Whip in the Parliament of Ghana.

Early life and education 
Ibrahim was born on 6 May 1974, in Banda Ahenkro in the Bono Region of Ghana. Ibrahim studied at the University of Ghana where he received a bachelor's degree in Political Science and Philosophy in 2001.

Career 
He was the chief executive officer of Flamingo Publications (Ghana) Limited.

Politics 
Ibrahim began his political career in 2009 after being declared the winner of the 2008 Ghanaian General Elections for his constituency. He was then elected into the 5th Parliament of the 4th Republic of Ghana on 7 January 2009. After the completion of his first term in office, Ibrahim decided to run for another term in 2013 and defeated Joe Danquah to retain his seat. In 2015 he contested and won the NDC parliamentary primaries for Banda constituency in the Bono Region of Ghana. He won this parliamentary seat during the 2016 Ghanaian general elections by getting 6,167 votes representing 52.03% against his opponent 5,660 votes representing 47.76%.

Committees 
Ibrahim is a member of the Special Budget Committee; a member of the Communications Committee; a member of the Local Government and Rural Development Committee; and a member of the Business Committee.

Personal life 
Ibrahim is a Christian. He is married with one child.

References

Ghanaian MPs 2017–2021
1974 births
Living people
National Democratic Congress (Ghana) politicians
People from Brong-Ahafo Region
Ghanaian MPs 2009–2013
Ghanaian MPs 2013–2017
Ghanaian MPs 2021–2025
University of Ghana alumni